Alfa Yaya Maudo, was a 19th-century ruler of Labé, one of the nine provinces of the Imamate of Futa Jallon (a muslim state ruled by Fula leaders), in present-day Guinea.

Alfa Yaya was born in the mid-19th century in the village of Fulamori, Guinea. His father was Alfa Ibrahima Diallo, then leader of Labé and a central figure during the siege of Kansala, the capital of the kingdom of Kaabu.

Alfa Yaya rose to power as the French began pushing into the interior of Guinea. He adopted a favorable stance toward the French, using them to enhance his own power. After the French defeated Futa Jallon in 1896, Alfa Yaya signed an accord with them on 10 February 1897 giving him control over a then independent Labé.

Alfa Yaya's relationship with the French went downhill in 1904, when French ceded part of Labé to the control of Portuguese Guinea, effectively taking away part of Alfa Yaya's territory. The government of what was then French Guinea arrested Alfa Yaya the following year and deported him to the French colony of Dahomey in 1905. Though released in 1910, he was again arrested in 1911 and taken to Port Etienne, where he died of scurvy the following year, on 10 August 1912. In 1968 his remains were returned to Guinea. His tomb is at the Camayanne Mausoleum, situated within the gardens of Conakry Grand Mosque.

References 
 Richard Andrew Lobban, Jr. and Peter Karibe Mendy, Historical Dictionary of the Republic of Guinea-Bissau, 3rd ed. (Scarecrow Press, 1997), p. 72 
 Thierno Diallo, Alfa Yaya, roi du Labe (Fouta Djallon) (Dakar, 1984)  page with book cover

,

1912 deaths
Guinean people
Year of birth missing
People from Boké Region